Gregory Reinhart (born June 18, 1951 in Pavilion, New York) is an American bass opera singer. He is noted for an extremely wide repertory which ranges from early music to the world premieres of several contemporary operas including Lowell Liebermann's The Picture of Dorian Gray, Philippe Manoury's K..., and Pascal Dusapin's Perelà, uomo di fumo. He has been praised in The Metropolitan Opera Guide to Recorded Opera for his performance in Monteverdi's L'Incoronazione di Poppea as one of the finest Senecas on record with "a magnificent bass voice: firm and clear throughout its wide range".

Biography
Gregory Reinhart was raised in upstate New York. In 1971, he entered Boston's New England Conservatory (NEC), where he studied voice with Mark Pearson and took master classes with Eleanor Steber. He graduated "with distinction" in 1974 and went on to receive his Master of Music Degree there in 1977. In 1976 he was a recipient of a fellowship award that also allowed him to train with Phyllis Curtin at the Tanglewood Music Center in Massachusetts. While at the NEC, he appeared in student performances of Ravel's L'heure espagnole and Donizetti's Don Pasquale. He directed the choir of St. John the Baptist in Quincy, sang with Emmanuel Music, and appeared as a soloist with the Boston Symphony Orchestra in the Monteverdi Vespers, Bach's St. Matthew Passion and Tchaikovsky's opera Eugene Onegin. Another early venture into opera was his performance in Verdi's Giovanna d'Arco with Boston Concert Opera, where according to the Boston Globe critic, Richard Dyer, "he sang the guest-star New York contingent right off the stage".

Reinhart first started training in voice with Professor Gloria Bugni McMaster at State University of New York at Geneseo, then went on to train as an opera singer at the American Institute of Musical Studies in Graz, where he took further classes with Eleanor Steber and studied with the soprano Patricia Brinton who encouraged him to continue his preparation in Paris. He remained with her there for two years, thanks to a private donor from Quincy, Adelina Chella. During his years in Paris, he received the advice and encouragement of Pierre Bernac and Camille Maurane. Most importantly for the development of his career, he met the French musicologist Jacques Chuilon in 1980.  Their collaboration in developing a vocal technique that permits Reinhart to perform a wide repertory from Bach to Mozart to the dramatic bass roles of Richard Wagner, as well as German Lieder and French Mélodie, continues to this day.

Reinhart made his French operatic debut with the Atelier Lyrique de Tourcoing in 1981,  when he sang the title role of Giovanni Paisiello's Le roi Théodore à Venise in its first performance in modern times. In 1984 he appeared at the Théâtre du Châtelet as both Huascar and Bellone in Rameau's Les Indes Galantes. It was the first time that a fully staged Rameau opera was performed in Paris with a full baroque period instrument orchestra. That same year he sang the role of Arnold in the French premiere of Hans Werner Henze's La chatte anglaise at the Opéra-Comique. Reinhart went on to sing leading bass roles in many of Europe's opera houses and concert halls over the next twenty years. Reinhart has also been a guest performer in opera, oratorio and recital in many prominent music festivals including the Aix-en-Provence Festival, the Handel Festival, Halle, the Santa Fe Opera Festival, the Rossini Opera Festival in Pesaro, and the Chorégies d'Orange Festival. Amongst the ensembles he has worked with are Groupe Vocale de France under John Alldis, Ensemble intercontemporain under Pierre Boulez, Concerto Vocale under René Jacobs, and Les Arts Florissants under William Christie.

Although he continues to be based in France, Reinhart has increasingly appeared in the United States. In 2002 he made his debut at New York City Opera as Claudius in Agrippina. His Washington National Opera debut followed in 2005 as The Old Hebrew in Samson et Dalila, conducted by Plácido Domingo. The following year he made his Metropolitan Opera debut as The Armoured Man in Die Zauberflöte. 2007 saw company debuts with Portland Opera as Oroveso in Norma and with Pittsburgh Opera as Sarastro in Die Zauberflöte. Gregory Reinhart opened San Francisco Opera's 2008–2009 season as Biterolf Landgraf in a new production of Tannhäuser.

World premiere performances
 Basil Hallward in Lowell Liebermann's The Picture of Dorian Gray, world premiere, Opéra de Monte-Carlo, 1996
 The Investigating Magistrate and The Prison Chaplain in Philippe Manoury's K..., world premiere, Opéra Bastille, 2001
 Pilone the Philosopher and The king's guard in Pascal Dusapin's Perelà, uomo di fumo, world premiere, Opéra Bastille, 2003
 le Bouddhiste in Alberto Bruni-Tedeschi's Secondatto, world premiere, Opéra de Nice, 1987

Repertoire
Gregory Reinhart's wide ranging stage repertoire includes:

 Beethoven
 Fidelio (Rocco)
 Bellini
 Norma (Oroveso)
 Berlioz
 Les Troyens (Panthée) (Narbal)
 Britten
 Billy Budd (Claggart)
 Alberto Bruni-Tedeschi
 Secondatto (le Bouddhiste) Campra
 Tancrède (Ismenor)
 Cesti
 L'Argia (Solimano)
 Orontea (Creonte)
 Semiramide (Feraspe)
 Cimarosa
 Il matrimonio segreto (Lord Robinson)
 Debussy
 Pelléas et Mélisande (Arkel)
 Donizetti
 Anna Bolena (Henry VIII)
 Dusapin
 Perelà, uomo di fumo (Pilone the Philosopher/The king's guard)
 Gilbert and Sullivan
 The Mikado (Poo-Bah)
 José Melchor Gomis (1791–1836)
 La Revenant (Sir Arundel)
 Gounod
 Roméo et Juliette (Frère Laurent)
 Handel
 Agrippina (Claudius)
 Alcina (Melisso)
 Ariodante (King of Scotland)
 Imeneo (Argenio)
 Orlando (Zoroastro)
 Saul (Saul)
 Henze
 La chatte anglaise (Arnold)
 Janáček
 The Cunning Little Vixen (The Badger/The Priest)
 Liebermann
 The Picture of Dorian Gray (Basil Hallward)

 Manoury
 K... (The Investigating magistrate/The Prison Chaplain)
 Meyerbeer
 Les Huguenots (Marcel)
 Monteverdi
 L'incoronazione di Poppea (Seneca)
 Il ballo delle ingrate (Plutone)
 L'Orfeo (Caronte/Plutone)
 Il ritorno di Ulisse in patria (Nettuno)
 Mozart
 Don Giovanni (Commendatore)
 Die Zauberflöte (Sarastro)
 La finta semplice (Don Cassandro)
 Giovanni Paisiello
 Le roi Théodore à Venise (Le roi Théodore)
 Prokofiev
 The Love for Three Oranges (Tchelio)
 Rameau
 Les Indes Galantes (Huascar/Bellone)
 Hippolyte et Aricie (Thésée/Pluton)
 Rihm
 Jakob Lenz (Oberlin)
 Rossini
 La Cenerentola (Alidoro)
 Le comte Ory (Le Gouverneur)
 La donna del lago (Douglas)
 Guillaume Tell (Walter Leuthold)
 L'italiana in Algeri (Mustafà)
 Sacrati
 La finta pazza (Capitano)
 Saint-Saëns
 Samson et Dalila (The Old Hebrew)
 Stravinsky
 Pulcinella (Bass soloist)
 The Rake's Progress (Trulove/Nick Shadow)
 Vivaldi
 La fida ninfa (Oralto)
 Wagner
 Tannhäuser (Landgraf) (Biterolf)
 Der fliegende Holländer (Daland)
 Parsifal (Gurnemanz) (Titurel)
 Tristan und Isolde (König Marke)
 Das Rheingold (Fasolt)
 Die Walküre (Hunding)
 Götterdämmerung (Hagen)

Selected discography
 Beethoven: Symphony No. 9 (Augér, Reinhart, Robbin, Rolfe Johnson; London Symphony Chorus; Academy of Ancient Music; Christopher Hogwood, conductor). Label: L'Oiseau-Lyre/Decca.
 Berlioz: L'enfance du Christ (Reinhart, Osada, Theruel, Saelens, Cognet; Radio Suisse Italienne Orchestra and Chorus; Serge Baudo, conductor). Label: Forlane
 Cesti: Orontea (Bierbaum, Cadelo, Müller-Molinari, Reinhart, Jacobs, Poulenard, De Mey, Sarti; Concerto vocale; René Jacobs, conductor). Label: Harmonia Mundi.
 Charpentier: Pastorale de Noël (Mellon, Feldman,  Reinhart; Les Arts Florissants; William Christie, conductor). Label: Harmonia Mundi.
 Handel: Messiah (Kweksilber, Bowman, Elliott, Reinhart; The Sixteen; Amsterdam Baroque Orchestra; Ton Koopman, conductor). Label: Erato.
 Handel: Saul (Kalpers, Jezovsek, Koch, Elwes, Kermes, Reinhart, Meier; Cologne Chamber Choir; Cartusianum Collegium; Peter Neumann, conductor). Label: MD&G Records
 Monteverdi: Il ballo delle ingrate (Laurens, Visse, Mellon, Reinhart, Feldman, Junghänel; Les Arts Florissants; William Christie, conductor). Label: Harmonia Mundi.
 Monteverdi: L'incoronazione di Poppea (Augér, Jones, Bowman, Reinhart, Watson, Beesley; City of London Baroque Sinfonia; Richard Hickox, conductor). Label: Virgin Classics
 Mozart: Requiem K. 626 (Hill, Visse, Reinhart, Alliot-Lugaz; Nord-Pas-de-Calais Regional Choir; La Grande Ecurie et la Chambre du Roy; Jean-Claude Malgoire, conductor). Label: Sony.
 Prokofiev: L'Amour des Trois Oranges (Bacquier, Bastin, Caroli, Dubosc, Fournier, Gautier, Henry, Lagrange, Parraguin, Reinhart, Texier; Opéra National de Lyon Orchestra and Chorus; Kent Nagano, conductor). Label: EMI Classics.

References

 Cadenhead, Frank, Perelà, Uomo di Fumo (review of the world premiere), Andante Magazine, February 2003. Accessed December 4, 2008.
 Cummings, David (ed.) International Who's who in Music and Musicians' Directory, Routledge, 2000, p. 535. 
 Dyer, Richard A Well-tempered Reinhart Returns to Boston After 10 Years in France, Boston Globe, April 12, 1987. Accessed via subscription December 4, 2008.
 Gruber, Paul (1993) The Metropolitan Opera Guide to Recorded Opera, New York: Metropolitan Opera Guild. 
 Metropolitan Opera performance archives. Accessed December 4, 2008.
 Midgette, Anne, Mother Knows Best For Her Little Nero, New York Times, April 9, 2002. Accessed December 4, 2008.
 Midgette, Anne, 'Magic Flute' as a Pageant With Technical Frailties, New York Times, January 23, 2006. Accessed December 4, 2008.
 Page, Tim, Torpid 'Samson' Finding Strength in Its Performances, Washington Post, May 16, 2005. Accessed December 4, 2008.
 Riding, Alan, Making New Opera Unstylishly Melodic (review of the world premiere of The Picture of Dorian Gray), New York Times, May 22, 1996. Accessed December 4, 2008.
 Riding, Alan, An Electronic Swirl for a Claustrophobic Labyrinth (review of the world premiere of K...), New York Times, April 5, 2001. Accessed December 4, 2008.

External links
  gregoryreinhart.com  Official blog
 Gregory Reinhart (Bass) – biography on bach-cantatas.com
 Reviews of Gregory Reinhart's performances and recordings in Opera News''

1951 births
Living people
American opera singers
People from Genesee County, New York
Operatic basses